Eurypteryx obtruncata is a moth of the  family Sphingidae. It is known from Sulawesi.

It is similar to Eurypteryx bhaga, but the forewing outer margin is more curved and the hindwing apex is obtusely cut. The forewing upperside has an antemedian band lacking a pale border. The forewing underside has no distinct median lines.

References

Eurypteryx
Moths described in 1903